Events from the year 2008 in Sweden

Incumbents

 Monarch – Carl XVI Gustaf
 Prime Minister – Fredrik Reinfeldt

Events

1 October – Rivality strategy game is released.

Deaths

 4 January – Stig Claesson, writer (born 1928)
 6 January – Anders Paulrud, writer (born 1951).
 13 January – Tommy Limby, cross-country skier (born 1947).
 12 March – Folke Eriksson, water polo player (born 1925).
 16 March – Ola Brunkert, drummer (born 1946)
 30 March – Anders Göthberg, guitarist (born 1975)

See also
 2008 in Swedish television

References

 
Years of the 21st century in Sweden
Sweden